Guanghua may refer to:


Places in China

County
Guanghua County, former county in Hubei, now part of Laohekou

Towns
These are all written as "":
Guanghua, Jilin (zh), in Tonghua County, Jilin
Guanghua, Xiangning County (zh), Shanxi

Townships
These are all written as "":
Guanghua Township, Shanxi (zh), in Wanrong County
Guanghua Township, Sichuan (zh), in Yilong County

Subdistricts
Guanghua Subdistrict, Laohekou (zh), Laohekou, Xiangyang, Hubei
Guanghua Subdistrict, Qianjiang (zh), Hubei
Guanghua Subdistrict, Wenzhou (zh), in Lucheng District, Wenzhou, Zhejiang
Written as "":
Guanghua Subdistrict, Shantou (zh), in Jinping District, Shantou, Guangdong
Guanghua Subdistrict, Liaoyang (zh), in Hongwei District, Liaoyang, Liaoning
Guanghua Subdistrict, Chengdu (zh), in Qingyang District, Chengdu, Sichuan

Guanghua Road Subdistrict
Guanghua Road Subdistrict, Anyang (zh), in Wenfeng District, Anyang, Henan
Guanghua Road Subdistrict, Pingdingshan (zh), in Weidong District, Pingdingshan, Henan
Guanghua Road Subdistrict, Nanjing (zh), in Qinhuai District, Nanjing, Jiangsu

Others
Guanghua School of Management (zh), part of Peking University
Guanghua University, former university
Guanghua Temple (disambiguation)
Guang Hua Digital Plaza, marketplace in Zhongzheng District, Taipei, Taiwan
Kwong Wah Yit Poh, Chinese-language newspaper of Malaysia